Rasher or Rashers may refer to:

 Rasher (artist), an Irish figurative artist
 Rasher (comics), a British comic strip
 Rasher, a slice of bacon, in the United Kingdom and Ireland 
 Rasher, a recurring character in the TV series Blood Drive
 Rashers Tierney, a character on Strumpet City played by David Kelly
 Sebastes miniatus, a fish also known as the vermilion rockfish
 USS Rasher, a former US Navy vessel

See also
Rash (disambiguation)